The Mississippi Coast Yachting Association was organized to promote the sport of yacht racing on the Mississippi Gulf Coast and nearby areas.

History
Founded in 1947, the MCYA is composed of the seven members of the Gulf Yachting Association located in the Mississippi coastal counties of Jackson, Harrison and Hancock.

Members
Bay Waveland Yacht Club
Biloxi Yacht Club
Gulfport Yacht Club
Long Beach Yacht Club
Ocean Springs Yacht Club
Pass Christian Yacht Club
Singing River Yacht Club

Sailing
It sanctions various yachting events, including interclub competition in Flying Scots, and serves to coordinate the association activities of its member clubs. One event, the Chapman Regatta is believed to be the oldest consecutively sailed interclub Team Racing contest in the United States. The teams consist of three boats from each of the seven Mississippi Coast Yacht Clubs. The regatta consists of four races sailed in Flying Scots, which are  open sailboats that carry a mainsail, jib and spinnaker. This regatta involves a significant number of sailing enthusiasts from one end of the Mississippi Coast to the other, and it annually attracts many of the best sailors on the Coast.

The organization also sponsors the Race Week Regatta which is raced in the fall at one of the member clubs (the event rotates annually) and the Great Ship Island Race.

Each year a sailor from the Mississippi Gulf Coast is chosen as the Budweiser Sailor of the Year.

Notes

External links
 Gulf Yachting Association Web Page
 Sailing the Mississippi Coast

Organizations based in Mississippi
Hancock County, Mississippi
Harrison County, Mississippi
Jackson County, Mississippi
Sailing in Mississippi
Sports in the Southern United States
Yachting associations in the United States